Home entertainment server systems differ from traditional media center systems in that they designed from inception for storage, management and sharing of entertainment content, much as a file server is mission designed to share traditional computer files.  These systems are optimized for entertainment file sharing allowing libraries to be accessed across multiple servers from multiple rooms. They also integrate a range of content acquisition facilities including shared networking, built-in optical drives and tuners. These systems are operated from a simple TV-based menu. Individual servers feature secure volume managed expandable storage including internal, and external drives and arrays of drives into the multi-terabyte range.

The Telly (home entertainment server) is an example of such a device.

Home servers